Brudermann is a surname. Notable people with the surname include:

Adolf von Brudermann (1854–1945), Austro-Hungarian general, brother of Rudolf
Nin Brudermann, Austrian artist
Rudolf von Brudermann (1851–1941), Austro-Hungarian general